Alcover is a municipality in the comarca of Alt Camp, Tarragona, Catalonia, Spain.

The Prades Mountains are located in the vicinity of this municipality.

It is the birthplace of the footballer Kiko Casilla.

References

External links
 
 Government data pages 
Dario Casilla (2010) mayor of Alcover

Municipalities in Alt Camp
Populated places in Alt Camp